Concierto is an album by the Jim Hall sextet, featuring Paul Desmond, Chet Baker, Ron Carter, Steve Gadd and Roland Hanna. It was produced by Creed Taylor for his CTI Records label and recorded at Van Gelder Studio in New Jersey on April 16 and 23, 1975. Concierto is named after the featured 19-minute jazz version of the classical piece for guitar, Concierto de Aranjuez by Joaquín Rodrigo.

Track listing 
"You'd Be So Nice to Come Home To" (Cole Porter) – 7:08
"Two's Blues" (Jim Hall) – 3:51
"The Answer Is Yes" (Jane Hall) – 7:41
"Concierto de Aranjuez" (Joaquín Rodrigo) – 19:22

Bonus tracks on CD reissue:
"Rock Skippin'" (Ellington, Strayhorn) – 6:14
"Unfinished Business" (Andrews, Carter, Chavez, Hall, Von Roth) – 2:37
"You'd Be So Nice to Come Home To" [Alternate Take] - 7:28
"The Answer Is Yes" [Alternate Take] - 5:36
"Rock Skippin'" [Alternate Take] - 6:05

Tracks 3, 4 recorded on April 16, 1975; tracks 1, 2, 6, 8 on April 23, 1975.

Personnel
Jim Hall – guitar, acoustic guitar
Paul Desmond – alto saxophone
Chet Baker – trumpet
Roland Hanna – piano
Ron Carter – upright bass
Steve Gadd – drums

References 

1975 albums
Jim Hall (musician) albums
Albums produced by Creed Taylor
CTI Records albums
Albums recorded at Van Gelder Studio